Marcelo José das Neves Alves Caetano  (17 August 1906 – 26 October 1980) was a Portuguese politician and scholar. He was the second and last leader of the Estado Novo after succeeding António Salazar. He served as prime minister from 1968 to 1974, when he was overthrown during the Carnation Revolution.

Early life and career 
He was the son of José Maria de Almeida Alves Caetano and his first wife Josefa Maria das Neves. Graduated as a Licentiate and later a Doctorate in Law, Caetano was a Cathedratic Professor at the Faculty of Law of the University of Lisbon. A conservative politician and a self-proclaimed reactionary in his youth, Caetano started his political career in the 1930s, during the early days of the regime of António de Oliveira Salazar.

Caetano soon became an important figure in the Estado Novo government, and in 1940, he was appointed chief of the Portuguese Youth Organisation. Caetano progressed in his academic career at the university, published several works and lectured law. In jail for political reasons, Álvaro Cunhal, a law student, the future leader of the Portuguese Communist Party, submitted his final thesis on the topic of abortion before a faculty jury that included Caetano.

Between 1944 and 1947, Caetano was minister of the colonies, and in 1947, he became the president of the executive board of the National Union. He also served as president of the Corporative Chamber between 1949 and 1955.

From 1955 to 1958, he was the minister attached to the presidency of the Council of Ministers and was the most powerful man in the regime after Salazar, who was approaching the age of retirement. Their relationship was tense at times, which stopped Caetano from being a clear successor. He returned to his academic career and maintained formally-important political functions such as the executive president of the National Union, Caetano became the ninth rector of the University of Lisbon from 1959, but the Academic Crisis of 1962 led him to resign after protesting students clashed with riot police in the campus. On the other hand, students who supported the regime tried to boycott the anti-regime activism. There were indeed three generations of militants of the radical right at the Portuguese universities and schools between 1945 and 1974 who were guided by a revolutionary nationalism partly influenced by the political subculture of European neofascism. The core of these radical students' struggle lay in an uncompromising defence of the Portuguese Empire in the days of the fascist regime.

Prime minister 
In August 1968, Salazar suddenly suffered a stroke after a fall in his home.  After 36 years in office, the 79-year-old was dismissed by President Américo Tomás. After weighing a number of choices, Tomás appointed Caetano to replace Salazar on 27 September 1968. However, no one informed Salazar that he had been removed as leader of the regime that he had largely created. By some accounts, when Salazar died in July 1970, he still believed he was prime minister.

Many people hoped that the 101st prime minister would soften the edges of Salazar's authoritarian regime and modernise the economy.  Caetano moved to foster economic growth and some social improvements, such as the awarding of a monthly pension to rural workers who had never had the chance to pay social security. The three objectives of Caetano's pension reform were to enhance equity, reduce the fiscal and actuarial imbalance and achieve more efficiency for the economy as a whole such as by establishing contributions that were less distortive to labour markets and allowing the savings generated by pension funds to increase the investments in the economy. Some large-scale investments were made at the national level, such as the building of a major oil processing center in Sines.

The economy reacted very well at first, but in the 1970s, some serious problems began to show, partly because double-digit inflation started 1970 and partly because of the short-term effects of the 1973 oil crisis despite the largely-unexploited oil reserves, which Portugal had in its overseas territories in Angola and São Tomé and Príncipe that were being developed and promised to become sources of wealth in the medium to long term.

Caetano's political power was largely held in check by Tomás, more by a balance of power and by personalities than any constitutional provision. On paper, the president's power to remove Salazar had been the only check on his power. Tomás, like his predecessors, had largely been a figurehead under Salazar, but he was not willing to give as free a hand to Caetano. As a result, there was little that Caetano actually could or would do. He considered running for president himself but dismissed the idea.

Although Caetano had been one of the architects of the Estado Novo, he took some steps to blunt the harsher edges of the regime in the so-called "political spring" (also called Marcelist Spring – Primavera Marcelista). He referred to his regime as a "social state" and changed the name of the official party, the National Union to the "People's National Action" (Acção Nacional Popular). The PIDE, the dreaded secret police, was renamed the DGS (Direcção Geral de Segurança, General-Directorate of Security). He also eased press censorship and allowed the first independent labor unions since the 1920s. The opposition was allowed to run in the 1969 election.  

Even with those reforms, the conduct of the 1969 and 1973 legislative elections was little different from past elections over the previous 40 years. The opposition was barely tolerated. While opposition candidates were theoretically allowed to stand (as had been the case since 1945), they were subjected to harsh repression. In both elections, the People's National Action swept every seat. The National Assembly was considered as not a chamber for parties but popular representatives, who were chosen and elected on a single list. In the only presidential election held under Caetano, in 1972, Tomás was elected unopposed by the government-controlled legislature.

The changes from the "political spring" (or "evolution in continuity," as Caetano called it) were far too little for large elements of the population that were eager for more freedom and had no memory of the instability that preceded Salazar. However, even those meager reforms had to be extracted with some effort from the more hardline members of the government, especially Tomás.

At bottom, Caetano was still an authoritarian himself, and never understood democracy. He was very disappointed when he discovered that the opposition was not content with the reforms he was able to wring out of the hardliners. After the 1973 elections, the regime's hardliners used their proximity to Tomás to pressure Caetano into abandoning his reform experiment. He had little choice but to acquiesce, since he had spent nearly all of his political capital to enact his reforms in the first place.

Since the early 1960s, the Portuguese overseas provinces in Africa had been struggling for independence, but the government in Lisbon, was not willing to concede it, and Salazar sent troops to fight the guerrillas and the terrorism of the independence movements. By 1970, the war in Africa was consuming as much as 40% of the Portuguese budget, and there was no solution in sight. At a military level, despite the containment of the various independence movements with differentiating levels of success, their impending presence and their failure to disappear dominated public anxiety. Throughout the war, Portugal also faced increasing dissent, arms embargoes and other punitive sanctions imposed by most of the international community.

After spending the early years of his priesthood in Africa, the British priest Adrian Hastings created a storm in 1973 with an article in The Times about the "Wiriyamu Massacre" in Mozambique. He revealed that the Portuguese Army had massacred 400 villagers in the village of Wiriyamu, near Tete, in December 1972.

His report was printed a week before Caetano was supposed to visit Britain to celebrate the 600th anniversary of the Anglo-Portuguese alliance. Portugal's growing isolation following Hastings's claims has often been cited as a factor that helped to bring about the Carnation Revolution, a coup that deposed Caetano's regime in 1974.

By the early 1970s, the counterinsurgency war had been won in Angola, it was less than satisfactorily contained in Mozambique and dangerously stalemated in Portuguese Guinea and so the Portuguese government decided to create sustainability policies to allow continuous sources of financing for the war effort for the long run. On 13 November 1972, a sovereign wealth fund, the Fundo do Ultramar (Overseas Fund) was enacted to finance the counterinsurgency effort in the Portuguese overseas territories. In addition, new decree laws (Decretos-Leis n.os 353, de 13 de Julho de 1973, e 409, de 20 de Agosto) were enforced to reduce military expenses and increase the number of officers by incorporating irregular militia as if they were regular military academy officers.

Overthrow
By the beginning of 1974, signals of rebellion increased. The Armed Forces Movement was formed within the army and started planning a coup to end the regime. In March, an unsuccessful attempt against the regime was made. By then, Caetano had offered his resignation to the president more than once but his request was denied. There was now little attempt or political possibility of controlling the movements of the opposition.

On 25 April 1974, the military overthrew the regime in the Carnation Revolution. Caetano resigned and was taken into military custody.

The combined African independentist guerrilla forces of the People's Movement for the Liberation of Angola (MPLA), the National Union for the Total Independence of Angola (UNITA) and the National Liberation Front of Angola (FNLA) in Angola; the PAIGC in Portuguese Guinea and the FRELIMO in Mozambique succeeded in their nationalistic rebellion when their continued guerrilla warfare prompted elements of the Portuguese Armed Forces to stage a coup at Lisbon in 1974.

The Armed Forces Movement overthrew the Lisbon government as a protest against the ongoing war in Portuguese Guinea that seemed to have no military end in sight, to rebel against the new military laws that were to be presented the next year (Decretos-Leis n.os 353, de 13 de Julho de 1973, e 409, de 20 de Agosto), to reduce military expenses and to incorporate militia and military academy officers in the army branches as equals.

Later life
After Caetano had resigned, he was flown under custody to the Madeira Islands, where he stayed for a few days. He then flew to exile to Brazil, which was ruled by its own dictatorship. He died in Rio de Janeiro of a heart attack in 1980.

Publications
Caetano published several books, including several highly-rated law books and two books of memoirs in exile: Minhas Memórias de Salazar (My Memories of Salazar) and Depoimento (Testimony).

He was one of the world's greatest authorities in administrative law, and some of his works were studied even in Soviet universities. He also wrote Os nativos na economía africana in 1954. During his exile in Brazil, he pursued academic activities and published works on administrative and constitutional law.

Personal life
On 27 October 1930, Caetano married Maria Teresa Teixeira de Queirós de Barros (23 July 1906 – 14 January 1971), the sister of the antifascist politician Henrique de Barros, the only President of the Constituent Assembly of Portugal, the daughter of writer João de Barros and his wife, Raquel Teixeira de Queirós; and the paternal granddaughter of the first viscount of Marinha Grande. He had four children:
 José Maria de Barros Alves Caetano (b. Lisbon, 16 August 1933), married firstly to Maria João Ressano Garcia de Lacerda, daughter of João Caetano Soares da Silveira Pereira Forjaz de Lacerda (Paris, 13 September 1903 – ?) (a distant relative of the 1st Baron and 1st Viscount of Nossa Senhora das Mercês, the 1st Baron of Salvaterra de Magos and the 1st Viscount of Alvalade) and wife Maria Júlia Cardoso Ressano Garcia (Lisbon, 4 December 1909 – ?) (granddaughter of the 51st Minister of the Treasury on 7 February 1897 Frederico Ressano Garcia, Spanish, and twice great-niece of the 1st Baron and 1st Viscount of Nossa Senhora da Luz), whom he divorced, and had issue, and married secondly as her second husband to Maria Laura do Soveral Rodrigues Luís (b. Benguela, 23 March 1933), divorced with issue from Edmundo Gastão da Costa Ribeiro da Silva and daughter of António Carlos Luís and wife Ernestina da Lança do Soveral Rodrigues (b. Castro Verde, Castro Verde), a distant relative of the 1st Viscount of Belver, and had issue.
 João de Barros Alves Caetano (Lisbon, 12 December 1931 – 27 June 2009), an Architect and the 1,332nd Associate of the Clube Tauromáquico, married to French Françoise Michelle Nicolas, and had an issue.
 Miguel de Barros Alves Caetano (b. Lisbon, São Sebastião da Pedreira, 26 July 1935), married to Maria José de Freitas Pereira Lupi (b. Lisbon, Lumiar, 26 September 1934), daughter of José Lupi (Lisbon, Encarnação, 22 September 1902 – Lisbon, Lumiar, 16 January 1970), of Italian male line descent, and wife (m. Lisbon, 19 June 1930) Maria Amélia de Freitas Pereira (Lisbon, 4 July 1900 – Lisbon, 5 December 1982), and had issue.
 Ana Maria de Barros Alves Caetano (b. Lisbon, 7 December 1937), married in Lisbon, Alvalade, in 1997 as his second wife to Caetano Maria Reinhardt Beirão da Veiga (b. 1941), divorced with issue from Maria Teresa Nunes de Albuquerque Teotónio Pereira, a renowned Architect, without issue

Notes

References

1906 births
1980 deaths
People from Lisbon
Prime Ministers of Portugal
Estado Novo (Portugal)
Carnation Revolution
Leaders ousted by a coup
Portuguese emigrants to Brazil
National Union (Portugal) politicians
University of Lisbon alumni
20th-century Portuguese lawyers
Recipients of the Order of the Tower and Sword
Grand Crosses of the Order of Christ (Portugal)
Portuguese exiles
Portuguese legal scholars